De Letzeburger Bauer is a newspaper published in Luxembourg.

References

Weekly newspapers published in Luxembourg